Valbella may refer to:

 Valbella (restaurant), an Italian restaurant in Greenwich, Connecticut, United States
 , a village in Graubünden, Switzerland
 13th Motorized Infantry Battalion "Valbella", Italian Army unit that succeeded the first iteration of the 13th Infantry Regiment "Pinerolo"